Fred Besana (born March 9, 1954) is a former American football player, a quarterback for the Oakland Invaders of the United States Football League. He was briefly on the rosters of the Buffalo Bills and the New York Giants of the National Football League, but never saw regular season action.

Early life and college
Born in Roseville, California, Besana played college football at the University of California in Berkeley under head coach Mike White, where he was primarily a back-up to All-Americans Steve Bartkowski and Joe Roth. He started the first three games of the 1975 season.

Professional career
Besana was selected by the Buffalo Bills in the fifth round (115th overall) of the 1977 NFL draft. He was active for two games in 1977 and two games in 1978, before being released by the Giants on August 13, 1979. With his NFL career effectively over, Besana returned to California and played semi-pro ball for the Twin Cities Cougars, based in Marysville, of the California Football League from 1980–1982, while he sold insurance and was a partner in a beer distributorship.

Oakland Invaders
The Oakland Invaders signed Besana on January 26, 1983, and he won the starting job for the Invaders under head coach John Ralston and led them to a 9-9 record and the Pacific Division title.  The Invaders lost in the first round of the playoffs to the league's eventual champion, the Michigan Panthers, 37–21.  Besana, age 29, was the league's second-ranked QB, behind Michigan's Bobby Hebert, spreading the ball around to four receivers who caught over 50 passes; he threw 21 touchdown passes and totaled 3,980 yards. Following the season, All-League tight end Raymond Chester retired and by the start of the next season big play threat wide receiver Wyatt Henderson would also be off the team.

Without two of his top four receivers to stretch the defense in 1984, opposing defenses were able to smother the Invader offense.  In spite of a strong defense, the team lost its first nine games --- scoring a total of 82 points.  Without a running game and with few good receiving options, Besana struggled.  In the second half of the season, halfback Eric Jordan emerged as an effective feature back. Besana, Jordan, and WR Gordon Banks combined to reignite the offense.  The team won 7 of their last 9 games.

Following the 1984 season the Invaders merged with the Michigan Panthers and Besana was forced to the bench backing up Hebert on the eventual Western Conference champions. The new team retained Jordan & Banks and added Michigan stars Albert Bentley, Anthony Carter, Derek Holloway, & John Williams.  Besana did see the field a few times in 1985 with this team full of weapons, and he put up the third best QB rating in the league.

Following the folding of the USFL, Besana ran his beer distributorship in Yuba City and was a volunteer coach at Yuba College in Marysville.

Career statistics

Family
His father, Fred Besana, played for the Baltimore Orioles in 1956.

Video
You Tube – interview with Keith Jackson of ABC sports – July 9, 1983

References

External links

Sports Reference – collegiate statistics – Fred Besana 
Total Football Stats – Fred Besana
Our Sports Central – USFL players
USFL Info – Oakland Invaders all-time roster

1954 births
Living people
Sportspeople from Roseville, California
Players of American football from California
American football quarterbacks
California Golden Bears football players
Buffalo Bills players
New York Giants players
Oakland Invaders players